The 1984 NFL Draft was the procedure by which National Football League teams selected amateur college football players. It is officially known as the NFL Annual Player Selection Meeting. The draft was held May 1–2, 1984, at the Omni Park Central Hotel in New York City, New York. No teams elected to claim any players in the regular supplemental draft that year. The NFL did have a special supplemental draft for college seniors who had already signed with the USFL or CFL on June 5, 1984.

The 1984 draft was the first in ten years in which a quarterback was not selected in the first round; the first quarterback selected in 1984 was Boomer Esiason, who was selected by the Cincinnati Bengals in the second round, with the 38th overall pick. The New England Patriots instead used the first overall pick of the draft to select a wide receiver, Irving Fryar.

Player selections

Round one

Round two

Round three

Round four

Round five

Round six

Round seven

Round eight

Round nine

Round ten

Round eleven

Round twelve

Hall of Famers
To date, no member of the 1984 NFL draft has been inducted into the Professional Football Hall of Fame.

Notable undrafted players

References

External links
 NFL.com – 1984 Draft
 databaseFootball.com – 1984 Draft
 Pro Football Hall of Fame
 Pro Sports Transactions

National Football League Draft
NFL Draft
Draft
NFL Draft
NFL Draft
American football in New York City
1980s in Manhattan
Sporting events in New York City
Sports in Manhattan